The Ceylon Federation of Labour (CFL) is an organisation bringing together trade unions in the private, semi-government and co-operative sectors of Sri Lanka.

History 
The Ceylon Federation of Labour was registered as a federation of unions by the Workers & Peasants Union, which was led by the Radical Party under the influence of the ideas of M.N. Roy of India. When the Lanka Sama Samaja Party re-commenced its trade union activity in the post-war period, it did so in co-operation with the Workers & Peasants Union and gradually took over leadership of the CFL by 1946.

The CFL was involved in the general strike of 1946 and its successor of 1947. It was the prime mover in the hartal of 1953.

Affiliated unions 
 All Ceylon Commercial and Industrial Workers' Union (ACCIWU)
 All Ceylon Oil Workers’ Union (ACOWU)
 All Ceylon United Motor Workers' Union (ACUMWU)
 Lanka Estate Workers' Union (LEWU)
 Lanka Hotel Employees Union (LHEU)
 United Corporations and Mercantile Union (UCMU)
 United Port Workers Union (UPWU)

Noted leaders 
 Dr N.M. Perera
 Dr Colvin R de Silva
 D.G. William ('Galle Face' William)
 W.P. Perera ('Elephant' Perera)
 Batty Weerakoon
 S. Siriwardena

References
 Batty Weerakoon, The Ceylon Federation of Labour & the Trade Union Movement in Sri Lanka (1932-1975), (abridged version) accessed on 4 November 2005.
 Leslie Goonewardene, Short History of the Lanka Sama Samaja Party  accessed 4 November 2005.
 Colvin R. de Silva, Hartal! accessed 4 November 2005.
 James Jupp, Sri Lanka — Third World Democracy, Frank Cass, London, 1978.

Trade unions in Sri Lanka